Charles Negedu (born 10 October 1989 in Kaduna) is a football player, who currently plays for Enugu Rangers.

Career
Negedu began his career with Kaduna United F.C. who was 2007 promoted to the Nigerian Premier League team and left 15 January 2009 his native Nigeria to sign with Tunisian top club ES Sahel a five years contract. But after only one year in December 2009 his club ES Sahel resigns the contract and he turned back to Kaduna United F.C. After the season 200 with Kaduna United F.C. signed in summer 2010 with Tunisian side Olympique Béja.

References

1989 births
Living people
Nigerian footballers
Kaduna United F.C. players
Étoile Sportive du Sahel players
Expatriate footballers in Tunisia
Nigerian expatriate sportspeople in Tunisia
Association football midfielders
Sportspeople from Kaduna